Güven Turan (born 2 December 1943 , Gerze), a Turkish poet, writer, translator.

Biography 
He was born in Sinop, Gerze in 1944, and completed his secondary education at Maarif College in Samsun. He graduated from Ankara University, Faculty of Language, History, and Geography, Department of English Language and Literature in 1968. He completed his master's degree at the same university in 1973 and worked as an English lecturer. 1976-1995 working advertising unit in Istanbul.

Bibliography

Poem 
 Güneşler... Gölgeler... (1981)
 Peş (1982)
 Sevda Yorumları (1990)
 Bir Albümde Dört Mevsim (1991)
 İkaros’un Uçuşu (1993)
 Toplu Şiirler (1995)
 101 Bir Dize (1996)
 Gizli Alanlar (1997)
 Görülen Kentler (1999)
 İz Sürmek (2001)
 Cendere (2003)
 Çıkış (2008)

Story 
 Düş Günler (1989)
 Zemberek (2009)

Novel 
 Dalyan (1978)
 Yalnız mısın? (1987)
 Soğuk Tüylü Martı (1992)
 Bakır Çalığı (1994)
 Yazıyla Yaşamak (1996)
 Çerçevenin Dışından (2004)

Essay- criticism 

 Kendini Okumak (1987)
 Bakır Çalığı (1994 / 2006)
 Yazıyla Yaşamak (1996)
 Çerçevenin Dışından (2004)
 Süregelen (2005)
 Kuleden Bakmak (2012)

Translations 
 Aşk ve İsyan (K. Rexroth’tan seçme şiirler, 1991)
 Sınırsızdır Şiir (M. Holub’dan seçme şiirler, 1993)
 Seçme Şiirler (L. Glück’ten, 1994)
 Seçme Şiirler (W. C. Williams’tan, 1995)
 Seçme Şiirler (H. D.’den, 1995)
 Demir Adam/Demir Kadın: T. Hughes (2001)
 Raşid’in Dürbünü (J. Mahjoub, 2003).

Awards 
Güven Turan won the 1979 Turkish Language Association Novel Award with Dalyan, the 1990 Yunus Nadi Published Story Book Award with Dream Günler, the 1991 Yunus Nadi Unpublished Poetry Book Award with Four Seasons in an Album, the 2004 Golden Orange Poetry Award with Cendere' nude won.

References 

1943 births
Turkish-language writers
Turkish poets
Living people